Gwen Shamblin Lara (February 18, 1955 – May 29, 2021) was an American author, founder of the Christian diet program The Weigh Down Workshop and founder of the Remnant Fellowship.

She is the subject of the 2021 HBO Max docuseries, The Way Down: God, Greed, and the Cult of Gwen Shamblin.

Early life
Lara earned an undergraduate degree in dietetics and a master's degree in food and nutrition with an emphasis in Biochemistry from University of Tennessee, in Knoxville. She was a registered dietitian, consultant and a faculty member at Memphis State University for five years. She also worked in the city's Tennessee Department of Health for five years. Lara was raised in a Church of Christ family. She had two children and seven grandchildren.

Career and ministry

Weigh Down Workshop
Lara began a weight control consulting practice in 1980. She had struggled with her weight in college. She counseled that genetics, metabolism, and behavior modification did not explain why some people were thin while others were overweight. Lara founded the Weigh Down Workshop, a weight-loss program with no food restrictions, exercise regimens, weigh-ins, or calorie-counting in 1986.

Some experts expressed concern that the program eliminated exercise and guidance on food selection as recommended by the American Dietetic Association.

Lara developed Weigh Down Workshop while working on her master's degree at Memphis State University. As part of a counseling center, Lara hosted the first class in a mall in Memphis, Tennessee. The program was offered as small classes in retail and non-religious settings. She began hosting the program at Bellevue Baptist Church near Memphis in the 1990s. The program consisted of 12-week seminars guided by video and audio tapes featuring Lara.

The program was offered in about 600 churches in 35 U.S. states by 1994. The program was in more than 1,000 churches in 49 states, Great Britain and Canada by January 1995. The program had grown to about 5,000 churches, with about 10 percent located in Lara's home state of Tennessee, by July 1996. Approximately eight churches in Britain were hosting workshops in December 1996. Some participants in the U.S. hosted meetings in their homes.

In 1996, Weigh Down Workshop had a staff of 40 and built a headquarters in Franklin, Tennessee, and Lara began hosting an annual summer convention, Desert Oasis, in the Nashville area.

Weigh Down Workshop hosted more than 21,000 classes with more than 250,000 participants worldwide by August 1998. Classes were hosted in every U.S. state and in Canada and Europe.

Lara was criticized for using the Christianity label while building her business. In 2001, Nashville CBS affiliate WTVF investigated how Weigh Down Workshop leaders spent money. Lara said half the proceeds from Weigh Down Workshop were paid as taxes and the other half were put back into the program.

Remnant Fellowship Church 
Shamblin founded the Remnant Fellowship Church in Franklin, Tennessee in 1999. The church's building was completed in 2004 on 40 acres Lara purchased in Brentwood, Tennessee.

Upon her death in 2021, it was found that Shamblin's Will left none of her multimillion-dollar fortune to the church.

Writings 
Shamblin published The Weigh Down Diet, a book that advised readers to use spirituality to avoid overeating, in 1997. The book sold more than 1.2 million copies. The Weigh Down Diet teaches the love of food should be transferred to a love of God, and to cut food portions in half and eat only when hungry.

Shamblin wrote Rise Above, (2000) and Exodus Devotional (2002).

Shamblin sent an email to her followers saying that she believed that the doctrine of the Trinity was not biblical on August 10, 2000. In response, some evangelical churches dropped her program, Thomas Nelson Publishers canceled the publication of her next book, she was removed from the Women of Faith website and some employees left her staff.

Television, magazine and news media appearances
Shamblin appeared on television programs such as BBC, 20/20, A Current Affair, The View, and Dateline (Australia). as well as in such magazines as Family Circle, Good Housekeeping, Woman's Day, and many newspaper articles. She was featured on The Today Show, CNN's Larry King Live, DaySide, and The Early Show. Participants from the Weigh Down Workshop were featured on the cover of Good Housekeeping, in the Ladies' Home Journal, in People Magazine, First magazine, Quick and Simple, and in numerous newspaper articles. In 2007, The Tyra Banks Show devoted an hour-long program to Gwen, the Weigh Down Diet, the Remnant Fellowship and participants from Weigh Down programs.

Gwen and Weigh Down were featured on such television programs as WeTV's Secret Lives of Women and CBS’s The Insider in 2009. She began producing a live Internet show, You Can Overcome, in late 2011. A five-part HBO mini series entitled The Way Down: God, Greed, and the Cult of Gwen Shamblin aired in 2021.

Accusations of abuse 
A 2021 HBO Max 5-part docuseries  The Way Down: God, Greed, and the Cult of Gwen Shamblin explores some of the accusations made against Gwen Shamblin Lara and Remnant Fellowship Church over the years. The church posted a response to the series on the RemnantFellowship.org website.

Joseph and Sonya Smith were adherents of Shamblin and had an eight year old son, Josef. Sonya and Joseph routinely disciplined Josef by beating him with foot-long glue sticks, belts, and heated coat hangers; locking him in confined spaces for extended periods of time; and tying his hands with rope. Mrs. Smith told police that she “normally” gave the children their whippings in increments of ten blows each and that Josef had gotten several of those whipping sessions on the day of his death. The police reported that the Smiths locked Josef in his room to pray to a picture of Jesus on the ceiling and in a closet for days and even weeks. He was given only a bucket for a toilet. An older son sometimes held Josef down while the parents beat him with implements.

During the day on October 8, 2003, Joseph disciplined Josef several times, striking him repeatedly with a glue stick. County medical examiners concluded that eight-year-old Josef Smith died as a result of "acute and chronic" abuse.  Members of the Remnant Church led by Shamblin paid for the defense of the Smiths. They were convicted in Georgia v. Smith. After being convicted, the Smiths were then sentenced on March 27, 2007, to life plus 30 years in prison, the maximum punishment, by Cobb County Superior Court Judge James Bodiford.

Personal life
In 1978 she married David Shamblin, with whom she would have two children. In 2018 they divorced, and she married Joe Lara.

Lara lived with her husband and children in Ashlawn, a historic mansion in Brentwood, Tennessee that was built in 1838.

Death

Gwen and six church leaders, including her husband Joe and son-in-law Brandon Hannah, were killed when her 1982 Cessna Citation 501 private jet, bound for Palm Beach, Florida, crashed into Percy Priest Lake near Smyrna, Tennessee, shortly after takeoff on May 29, 2021.

The pilot, believed to be Joe Lara, held a commercial pilot certificate with an instrument rating, with his most recent Federal Aviation Administration second-class medical certificate being issued on November 12, 2019. Radar returns show the airplane made a series of heading changes and several climbs and descents before it entered a steep, descending left turn and impacted a shallow area of Percy Priest Lake about 2 to 8 feet (0.6 to 2.4 meters) deep.

Selected works

Books

Other media

References

External links
 
 Remnant Fellowship Church Website link Retrieved January 11, 2018
 IMDB Entry TV/Miniseries 2021- link Retrieve September 20, 2021

1955 births
2021 deaths
20th-century American non-fiction writers
20th-century American women writers
21st-century American non-fiction writers
21st-century American women writers
Accidental deaths in Tennessee
American non-fiction writers
Christian writers
Founders of new religious movements
People from Memphis, Tennessee
University of Memphis alumni
University of Tennessee alumni
Victims of aviation accidents or incidents in 2021
Victims of aviation accidents or incidents in the United States